Viișoara is a commune in Glodeni District, Moldova. It is composed of two villages, Moara Domnească and Viișoara.

References

Communes of Glodeni District